Vintebbio is a frazione (and parish) of the municipality of Serravalle Sesia, in Piedmont, northern Italy.

Overview

It is a village located some km south from the centre of Serravalle, on the right side of Sesia river. Vintebbio is located at the foot of a hill where the impressive ruins of a Middle Ages castle, built by the bishops of Vercelli, overlook the village.

Since 1927 it has been a separate comune (municipality).

References

External links

Frazioni of the Province of Vercelli
Former municipalities of the Province of Vercelli